Porthoustock is a hamlet near St Keverne in Cornwall, England, United Kingdom, on the east coast of Lizard Peninsula. Aggregates are quarried nearby and Porthoustock beach is dominated by a large concrete stone silo that was once used to store stone ready to load ships but is now disused. Coastal trading ships of up to  can dock alongside the pier  along the southern edge of the beach to be loaded with stone. Fishing boats operate from the pebble beach , with lobster and crab potting, net fishing and hand lines as the principal fishing methods. The South West Coast Path passes through Porthoustock.

Porthoustock lies within the Cornwall Area of Outstanding Natural Beauty (AONB). Almost a third of Cornwall has AONB designation, with the same status and protection as a National Park.

The name Porthoustock comes from the Cornish language words porth, meaning 'cove' or 'harbour', and Ewstek, a personal name.

History
Porthoustock originated as a fishing hamlet. However, from the 1890s the village developed as a port for the local stone quarries. There has been quarrying activity in Porthoustock since the late 19th century. By the 1940s the quarries were owned by Amalgamated Roadstone and provided stone to build Cornwall's wartime airfields. Porthoustock survived a German bombing raid in November 1940 with no casualties.

Lifeboat
The Royal National Lifeboat Institution (RNLI) stationed a lifeboat at Porthoustock in 1869 and built a boat house by the beach. An anonymous donor gifted a new lifeboat, Charlotte, on 23 September 1886. The last boat stationed here was the Kate Walker which arrived in 1931. After it was sold in 1946 it was converted to a yacht and was reported as being at Felixstowe Ferry in 2007. The station was closed in 1942 and has since become the village hall.

Geology
Analcime, analcite, epidote, hornblende, prehnite, calcite, diorite and pectolite are all minerals extracted from the quarries in Porthoustock. A natural rock formation known as the Giant's Quoits stands on the cliffs above Porthoustock. The rocks once stood on Manacle Point but were moved to their current position in 1967 due to the expansion of the quarries. The cliffs and quarries to the south of the hamlet are designated as part of Coverack to Porthoustock SSSI (Site of Special Scientific Interest) for their geological interest.

Economy
Aram Resources' West of England Quarry is adjacent to Porthoustock village. The quarry works a dark green diorite rock mass and has its own wharf allowing the loading of aggregates directly from the quarry to ships. The wharf is protected from the prevailing southwesterly Atlantic weather systems, ensuring minimal disruption to ship loading.

Diving
Porthoustock is a popular launching beach for divers en route to The Manacles and instruction in diving is available.

Notable residents
 Titanic survivor Mrs Annie Margaret Hold was born in Porthoustock. 
 Porthoustock resident Margaret James, was jailed for twenty years in July 2006, for the 2004 murder of parish councillor Peter Solheim.

References

External links

 

Hamlets in Cornwall
Industrial archaeological sites in Cornwall
Populated coastal places in Cornwall
Ports and harbours of Cornwall
St Keverne